The Ministry of Revenue was the ministry in Ontario, Canada responsible for administering most of the province's major tax statutes as well as a number of tax credit, incentive and benefit programs. The ministry was also responsible for managing relationships, particularly with the Canada Revenue Agency, in their administration of provincial taxes and benefit programs on behalf of Ontario. The ministry promoted the integrity of Ontario's self-assessing tax system by encouraging compliance through taxpayer education and customer service, while discouraging non-compliance through enforcement activities.

Following the 2011 Ontario general election, the Ministry of Revenue was merged into the Ministry of Finance.

Minister of Revenue

The Minister of Revenue was a cabinet of Ontario position most recently held by Sophia Aggelonitis as the Ontario Minister of Revenue.

List of past Ministers of Revenue:

 Charles MacNaughton 1968 (July–October)
 John White 1968-1971
 Eric Alfred Winkler 1971-1972
 Allan Grossman 1972-1974
 Arthur Meen 1974-1977
 Margaret Scrivener 1977-1978
 Lorne Maeck 1978-1981
 George Ashe 1981-1983
 Bud Gregory 1983-1985
 Gordon Howlett Dean 1985  (May–June)
 Robert Nixon 1985-1987
 Bernard Grandmaître 1987-1989
 Remo Mancini 1989-1990
 Shelley Wark-Martyn 1990-1993
 Michael Chan 2007 (February–September)
 Monique Smith 2007-2008
 Dwight Duncan 2008-2009
 John Wilkinson 2009-2010
 Sophia Aggelonitis 2011-2012

References

External links
 Ontario Ministry of Revenue website

Revenue
1968 establishments in Ontario
2012 disestablishments in Ontario
Canadian taxation government bodies